Schleiden is a town in North Rhine-Westphalia, Germany. It lies in the Eifel hills, in the district of Euskirchen, and has 12,998 inhabitants as of 30 June 2017. Schleiden is connected by a tourist railway to Kall, on the Eifel Railway between Cologne and Trier. The town consists of 18 settlements, the largest of which are Gemünd and Schleiden proper.

History

Mayors

 1972−1975: Max Fesenmeyer (independent)
 1975−1984: Herbert Hermesdorf (1914-1999) (CDU)
 1984−1995: Alois Sommer (CDU)
 1995−1997: Dieter Wolter (CDU)
 1997−2004: Christoph Lorbach (CDU)
 2004−2012: Ralf Hergarten (independent)
 2012–2018: Udo Meister (FDP)
 2018– : Ingo Pfennings (CDU)

Education
There are the following schools in the city:
Municipal High School 
Clara-Fey-High School, Schleiden (carrier is the diocese of Aachen)
Municipal Secondary School 
Primary school 
Elementary school 
Elementary school Gemünd
Elementary school Dreiborn
Astrid Lindgren School, Schleiden

Public figures

Johannes Sturm (Sturmius) (1507–1589), educator and scholar of the Renaissance, a professor in Paris and founder of the University of Strasbourg
Johannes Sleidanus (1506–1556), historian, professor, Schleiden / Strasbourg
Leopold Schoeller (1792–1884), industrialist and Privy Councillor of Commerce
Gustav Poensgen (1824–1904), industrialist and Privy Councillor of Commerce
Rudolf Poensgen (1826–1895), industrialist and councillor of commerce
Carl Poensgen (1838–1921), industrialist and Privy Councillor of Commerce
Larres Albert (1900–1987), painter 
Francis Albert Heinen (born 1953), journalist and nonfiction writer
George Schreiber (born 1958), photographer
Vera Hilger (born 1971), painter

References 

Euskirchen (district)
Districts of the Rhine Province